George Herbert Swift, Jr (July 1, 1926, Minot, ND – September 23, 2014) was an American mathematician and computer scientist. Swift attended the University of Oregon, earning a master's degree in mathematics in 1951, before attending the University of Washington, where he earned a PhD in mathematics in 1954 under Edwin Hewitt on irregular Borel measure. He began at Duke University in 1954 as an instructor before being IBM hired him in 1956; he would spend 32 years with the company, where he contributed to the development of the IBM 5100. He retired in 1988 from IBM to teach full-time in mathematics as well as computer science.

See also
 Borel measure
 Borel regular measure

Publications

References

External links 
 

1926 births
2014 deaths
20th-century American mathematicians
University of Washington alumni
Mathematical analysts
IBM employees
University of Oregon alumni
Duke University faculty